We Got Married (Season 4) is the fourth season of South Korean MBC's We Got Married, a reality variety show and was a segment of the Sunday Sunday Night program. First broadcast in 2008, the show pairs up Korean celebrities to show what life would be like if they were married. Each week, couples are assigned missions to complete, while interviews with the participants reveal their thoughts and feelings.

Couples
Original couples
 Leeteuk & Kang So-ra (Ep 133-134): Idol and actress
 Julien Kang & Yoon Se-ah (Ep 133-159): Actor/model and actress
 Hwang Kwang-hee & Han Sun-hwa (Ep 133-166): Two young idols who were friends before being paired together
 Lee Joon & Oh Yeon-seo (Ep 135-155): Young idol/aspiring actor and actress

Additional couples
 Jinwoon & Go Joon-hee (Ep 156-186): Idol and actress
 Jo Jung-chi & Choi Jung-in (Ep 160-186): Real-life couple (now married), both musicians/singers
 Lee Tae-min & Apink's Son Na-eun (Ep 167-203): Idol and idol
 Yoonhan & Lee So-yeon (Ep 187-213): Pianist and actress
 Jung Joon-young & Jung Yu-mi (Ep 187-222): Rocker and actress
 Jang Woo-young & Park Se-young (Ep 204-237): Idol and actress
 Namkoong Min & Hong Jin-young (Ep 214-262): Actor and singer
 Hong Jong-hyun & Yura (Ep 223-262): Actor and idol
 Song Jae-rim & Kim So-eun (Ep 238-275): Actor and actress
 Henry Lau & Kim Ye-won (Ep 263-264, 266-275): Idol/actor and actress
 Lee Jong-hyun & Gong Seung-yeon (Ep 263-286): Idol/actor and actress
 Oh Min-suk & Kang Ye-won (Ep 276-310): Actor and actress
 BTOB's Yook Sung-jae & Red Velvet's Joy (Ep 276-320): Idol and idol
 Kwak Si-yang & Kim So-yeon (Ep 287-316): Actor and actress
 Jo Se-ho & Fiestar's Cao Lu (Ep 311-314, 316-340): Comedian and idol
 Eric Nam & Mamamoo's Solar (Ep 316-348): Singer/MC and idol
 MADTOWN's Jota & Kim Jin-kyung (Ep 321-350): Idol and model
 Choi Tae-joon & Apink's Yoon Bo-mi (Ep 341-363): Actor and idol
 Untouchable's Sleepy & Lee Guk-joo (Ep 349-372): Singer and comedian
 Gong Myung & Jung Hye-sung (Ep 351-372): Actor/idol and actress
 Choi Min-yong & Jang Do-yeon (Ep 364-373): Actor and comedian

Episode summaries

References

External links 
 Official Website

We Got Married
2008 South Korean television seasons